Caballero was a Dutch professional cycling team that existed from 1962 to 1972.

References

External links

Cycling teams based in the Netherlands
Defunct cycling teams based in the Netherlands
1962 establishments in the Netherlands
1972 disestablishments in the Netherlands
Cycling teams established in 1962
Cycling teams disestablished in 1972